SAP S/4HANA is an enterprise resource planning software for large enterprises developed by SAP SE. It is the successor to SAP R/3 and SAP ERP and is optimized for SAP's in-memory database SAP HANA.

Purpose 
SAP S/4HANA is an enterprise resource planning (ERP) software package meant to cover all day-to-day processes of an enterprise (for example, order-to-cash, procure-to-pay, plan-to-product, and request-to-service) and core capabilities. It integrates functions from lines of businesses as well as industry solutions, and also re-integrates portions of SAP Business Suite products such as SAP SRM, SAP CRM and SAP SCM. As SAP Business Suite 4 only runs on the SAP HANA database it is packaged as one product: SAP S/4HANA. SAP's classical R3, ERP and ECC based business suite and related products were designed to run on several database platforms, including those from Oracle, Microsoft and IBM.

History 
The SAP HANA platform has been available since 2010, and SAP applications like SAP ERP and the SAP Business Suite are able to run on the SAP HANA database and/or other supported database systems.

The new suite, SAP S/4HANA, launched on 3 February 2015 at the New York Stock Exchange. The event introduced cloud and on premise editions, with the on-premises edition becoming available on the same day. The cloud edition went live at SAPPHIRE NOW (SAP’s annual customer conference) on 6 May 2015 in Orlando, Florida.

SAP S/4HANA was called SAP's biggest update to its ERP strategy and platform in over two decades. Post-launch, Gartner analysts noted that SAP S/4HANA represented a "transformational shift," but raised questions about functionality, availability, pricing and migration issues surrounding S/4HANA.

By 21 April 2015, 370 customers had purchased S/4HANA. After the first half of 2015, positive growth was confirmed for SAP. During the third quarter earning calls that took place in October 2015, SAP confirmed that S/4HANA had more than 1,300 customers.  By the end of Q4 2016, SAP announced that 5,400 customers had implemented SAP S/4HANA, growing to 8,900 customers by 30 June 2018.

Editions and deployment 

SAP S/4HANA can be deployed on-premises, in the cloud, or through a hybrid model. The S/4HANA product offering consists of various editions: SAP S/4HANA Cloud: previously called essentials edition (ES) and Multi-Tenant Edition, SAP S/4HANA Cloud extended edition: previously called Single-Tenant Edition, SAP S/4HANA Cloud, private edition, SAP S/4HANA On-Premise.

SAP S/4HANA On-Premise is similar in terms of coverage, functionality, industry-specific support, and localization to the current SAP Business Suite (in 39 languages, 64 country versions). 

SAP also offers SAP S/4HANA Cloud (in 18 languages, 33 country versions).  SAP has emphasized the product as pivotal to its cloud shift. 

Both editions consist of functionality for finance, accounting, controlling, procurement, sales, manufacturing, plant maintenance, project system, and product lifecycle management, plus integration with SAP SuccessFactors, SAP Ariba, SAP Hybris, SAP Fieldglass and SAP Concur.

Overview of releases
SAP S/4HANA (on-premise) releases are once per year, SAP S/4HANA Cloud releases are 2 per year. Version coding for cloud edition: YYMM example 1709 - September 2017. Version coding for on-premise edition (since 2020): YYYY example 2020 - Release 2020.  

SAP S/4HANA On-Premise releases:

 SAP S/4HANA Finance 1503: March 2015
 SAP S/4HANA 1511: November 2015
 SAP S/4HANA Finance 1605: May 2016
 SAP S/4HANA 1610: October 2016
 SAP S/4HANA 1709: September 2017
 SAP S/4HANA 1809: September 2018
 SAP S/4HANA 1909: September 2019
 SAP S/4HANA 2020: October 2020 (new nomenclature: switch to YYYY from YYMM) 
 SAP S/4HANA 2021: October 2021
 SAP S/4HANA 2022: October 2022

SAP S/4HANA Cloud releases:
 SAP S/4HANA Cloud 1603: March 2016
 SAP S/4HANA Cloud 1605: May 2016
 SAP S/4HANA Cloud 1608: August 2016
 SAP S/4HANA Cloud 1611: November 2016
 SAP S/4HANA Cloud 1702: February 2017
 SAP S/4HANA Cloud 1705: May 2017
 SAP S/4HANA Cloud 1708: August 2017
 SAP S/4HANA Cloud 1711: November 2017
 SAP S/4HANA Cloud 1802: February 2018
 SAP S/4HANA Cloud 1805: May 2018
 SAP S/4HANA Cloud 1808: August 2018
 SAP S/4HANA Cloud 1811: November 2018
 SAP S/4HANA Cloud 1902: February 2019
 SAP S/4HANA Cloud 1908: August 2019
 SAP S/4HANA Cloud 1911: November 2019
 SAP S/4HANA Cloud 2002: January 2020 
 SAP S/4HANA Cloud 2005: April 2020
 SAP S/4HANA Cloud 2008: July 2020
 SAP S/4HANA Cloud 2011: November 2020
SAP S/4HANA Cloud 2102: February 2021
SAP S/4HANA Cloud 2105: May 2021
SAP S/4HANA Cloud 2108: August 2021
SAP S/4HANA Cloud 2111: November 2021
SAP S/4HANA Cloud 2202: available February 2022

Implementation 

There are various ways to get to S/4HANA. This depends on a customer’s starting point. For example, new implementation, system conversion, and selective data transition.
 New implementation - This is a new implementation of SAP S/4HANA ("greenfield"): Customers who are migrating from a non-SAP legacy system or from an SAP ERP system and implementing a fresh system that requires an initial data load. In this scenario, the SAP S/4HANA system is implemented, and master and transactional data are migrated from the legacy system, thus standard data migration tools and content has to be used.
 System conversion - This is a complete conversion of an existing SAP Business Suite system to SAP S/4HANA ("brownfield"): Customers who want to change their current SAP ERP system to SAP S/4HANA. This scenario is technically based on Software Update Manager (SUM) with Database Migration Option (DMO) in case the customer is not yet on SAP HANA as the underlying database.
 Selective Data Transition (formerly: Landscape Transformation) - This is a consolidation of current regional SAP systems into one global SAP S/4HANA system or a split out of different parts of a system: Customers who want to consolidate their landscape or carve out selected entities (such as a company code) or processes into a single SAP S/4HANA system.

Product lifecycle 

Both SAP S/4HANA on-premises and the SAP S/4HANA cloud editions have release strategies. The cloud editions are released biannually. The on-premises edition has one new release per year and receives additional functionality and corrections in the form of Feature Pack Stacks (FPS) or Service Pack Stacks (SPS) each quarter.

On-premises: Each year, SAP is shipping a new product version of its on-premises SAP S/4HANA product (e.g. SAP S/4HANA 1610) this will always be followed by three successive FPS on a quarterly basis, after this SAP releases the next product version and the previous product version is receiving SPS on a quarterly basis until the end of mainstream maintenance. Technically, a FPS is like a SPS, but it may include non-disruptive, non-mandatory features. The numbering of FPS/SPS will be consecutive, i.e. the first SPS after a FPS3 would be consequently SPS4.

References

Further reading 
 

 
  
 
 
 

 

2015 software
SAP SE
ERP software
Enterprise software 
Business software
Cloud applications
Cloud platforms